Copelatus takakurai is a species of diving beetle. It is part of the subfamily Copelatinae in the family Dytiscidae. It was described by Satô in 1985.

References

takakurai
Beetles described in 1985